Giovanni Francesco Veronese was an 18th-century Italian mathematician from Maderno.

Life 
In 1774 Veronesi published in Venice his own Simple Arithmetic Solutions (Soluzioni aritmetiche semplici) to forty "various very curious questions" of mathematics, previously declared "insoluble without the help of algebra" by Jacques de Mondoteguy and exposed by Jean-Pierre Ricard in the 1722 essay Négoce d'Amsterdam.

Works

References 

18th-century Italian mathematicians